Des Morrison is a New Zealand politician who was an Auckland Councillor.

Early years
Morrison is of Ngapuhi descent and attended Pukekohe High School.

Political career

Morrison was a Franklin District Councillor between 2004 and 2010.

In the 2010 Auckland Council elections Morrison was elected as the member for the Franklin ward.

In 2012 he resigned from the renamed Communities & Residents, claiming that they were too urban-centric and he wanted to focus on rural issues before retiring in 2013.

References

Living people
Auckland Councillors
Māori politicians
People educated at Pukekohe High School
Year of birth missing (living people)